Rugby Club Red Star, (Serbian Cyrillic: Рагби Клуб Црвена Звезда), is a former rugby union team from Belgrade, Serbia. The club was a member of the Serbian Rugby Union. The team had a red and white strip.

Its name Crvena zvezda means Red Star, but the club was not formed by the Red Star Belgrade sports society, having been registered in the suburb of Zemun as an independent club.

Squads

External links

References

Serbian rugby union teams